

Ælfwig (died ) was a medieval Bishop of London.

Ælfwig was consecrated on 16 February 1014 and acceded to the bishopric some time between 1015 and 1018. He died about 1035.

Citations

References

External links
 

Bishops of London
1030s deaths
Year of birth unknown
11th-century English Roman Catholic bishops